Mount Musgrave is a mountain located in western Newfoundland, near the southern side of the Humber River valley at Steady Brook, approximately  east of Corner Brook.  The peak is named in honour of Sir Anthony Musgrave, a colonial governor of Newfoundland.

The steep ridges that form part of the northern side of the mountain are the location of Marble Mountain Ski Resort, the largest alpine ski resort in Atlantic Canada. The summit of the mountain hosts Environment Canada's doppler weather radar station "XME", part of the Canadian weather radar network.

See also
 Mountain peaks of Canada

References

Mount Musgrave